Winwick  may refer to:
Winwick, Cambridgeshire, England
Winwick, Cheshire, England
Winwick, Northamptonshire, England